Doing My Time is the fifth album released by American stand-up comedian Jim Gaffigan. The album was released on December 7, 2004, by Comedy Central Records.

Track listing
Elton John - 11:20
Recessive Genes - 1:09
Got Married - 4:40
Having My Baby - 4:08
Beautiful - 5:29
Midwest Thang - 4:01
Hoooot Pocket! - 5:13
Future Pope - 1:49
Slumberland - 7:55
Guy with the Red Umbrella - 2:56
Anti-Reading - 5:22
I'm a Manatee! - 4:22
Gravy Drinker - 5:30

References

2004 albums
Jim Gaffigan albums
Comedy Central Records live albums
Stand-up comedy albums
Live spoken word albums
2000s comedy albums